The 2021 Abierto Zapopan was a professional tennis tournament played on outdoor hard courts. It was the 2nd edition of the tournament and part of the 2021 WTA Tour.

Originally scheduled for 16–21 March 2020 in Guadalajara, Mexico and was part of the 125K series during the 2020 tennis season, but was cancelled due to the COVID-19 pandemic due to local restrictions, and the suspension of play on the WTA tour.

It took place in Guadalajara, Mexico from 8 to 13 March 2021 and it was a part of the WTA 250 tournaments, offering a total of $235,238 in prize money.

Champions

Singles

  Sara Sorribes Tormo def.  Eugenie Bouchard 6–2, 7–5

Doubles

  Ellen Perez /  Astra Sharma def.  Desirae Krawczyk /  Giuliana Olmos 6–4, 6–4.

Point distribution and prize money

Point distribution

Prize money 

*per team

Singles main-draw entrants

Seeds 

1 Rankings are as of 1 March 2021

Other entrants 
The following players received a wildcard into the singles main draw:
  Eugenie Bouchard
  Katie Volynets
  Renata Zarazúa

The following players received entry using a protected ranking into the main draw:
  Mihaela Buzărnescu
  Anna Karolína Schmiedlová
  CoCo Vandeweghe

The following players qualified into the singles main draw:
  Elisabetta Cocciaretto
  Lauren Davis
  Caroline Dolehide
  Leonie Küng
  Giuliana Olmos
  Astra Sharma

The following player received entry as a lucky loser:
  Harriet Dart

Withdrawals 
Before the tournament
  Kristie Ahn → replaced by  Anna Kalinskaya
  Daria Gavrilova → replaced by  Greet Minnen
  Viktorija Golubic → replaced by  Harriet Dart
  Kateryna Kozlova → replaced by  Anna-Lena Friedsam
  Jasmine Paolini → replaced by  Wang Xiyu
  Sloane Stephens → replaced by  Katarzyna Kawa
  Arantxa Rus → replaced by  Eugenie Bouchard

Doubles entrants

Seeds 

 1 Rankings as of 1 March 2021.

Other entrants 
The following pairs received wildcards into the doubles main draw:
  Eugenie Bouchard /  CoCo Vandeweghe
  Leylah Annie Fernandez /  Renata Zarazúa
The following pair received entry as alternates into the doubles main draw:
  Ingrid Neel /  Tamara Zidanšek

Withdrawals 
Before the tournament
  Arantxa Rus /  Tamara Zidanšek →  Aliona Bolsova /  Danka Kovinić

Retirements
  Aliona Bolsova /  Danka Kovinić (lower back injury)

References

External links 
 Official website

2021
2021 WTA Tour
2021 in Mexican tennis
March 2021 sports events in Mexico